In addition to their senior squad, Rangers Football Club also operate a football Academy which contains a number of football teams culminating in a B team, which currently participates in the Lowland League on a one-season basis as well as friendly challenge matches against various domestic and European sides in accordance with the academy's development plan, having declined the option to continue in the SPFL Reserve League despite winning the competition in 2019. Historically, the club's second side was known as the Rangers Swifts.

In the 2006–07 season, the under-20s won their league and the Scottish Youth Cup, ending rivals Celtic's run of six consecutive league titles and defeating them 5–0 in the final of the Youth Cup at Hampden Park. In 2019, the Rangers under-18 team qualified for the UEFA Youth League for the first time. Underage teams also take part in the Scottish Challenge Cup and the Glasgow Cup.

History

Beginnings of reserve football
Rangers' first known involvement in reserve league football was in 1895 when their club secretary William Wilton initiated the setting up of the Scottish Reserve League. The competition comprised the reserve sides of five clubs; Rangers, Celtic, Hearts, Leith Athletic and the Queens Park Strollers. In July 1896 the league was expanded to 10 sides, and renamed the Scottish Combination league. In 1909, a new Scottish Reserve League was set up, often including at least one non-reserve side of a non-league club in each of its seasons. The league was disbanded during World War I, but effectively re-established in 1919 as the Scottish Alliance League. As with previous incarnations, this reserve league also contained the first XI of several non-league sides. An AGM in 1938, resulted in the non-league sides being removed and the league became exclusive to First Division reserve sides. The advent of World War II, however, once again saw the suspension of national reserve league football in Scotland, although regional leagues were set up.

Inter war years
Upon the outbreak of the Second World War, all competitive football in Scotland was suspended. During this time there was special wartime football in the form of regional league competitions with Rangers playing in the Southern League. The regionalisation also saw Scottish reserve football postponed as the war effort put a major strain on the resources and playing staff of clubs with many of them serving in the Armed forces and some seeing active service abroad. The reserve side were crowned champions of their league in 1939 before seeing the following season abandoned.

1975 league reconstruction
With the end of hostilities in 1946, Rangers returned to play competitive football again with the reserve side featuring in the Scottish Reserve League. This was to continue unchanged for almost three decades until the first of many reconstructions were made to football in Scotland.

SPL breakaway
The formation of the Scottish Premier League in 1998, resulted in a significant change in youth team football in Scotland. The SPL began a league for members clubs youth players aged under-18. This was alongside the Reserve league, which had been revamped into a league primarily for under-21 players. Rangers would go on to win the under-18 league three times, first in 2001–02 then in 2006–07 and most recently in 2007–08.

Reconstructing the youth department
The opening of Rangers Training Centre (known as Murray Park) in 2001 was the one of the first stages in the club's move to develop a football academy. Although the nomenclature was not present at that time, Rangers did begin to focus upon youth development and under the then first-team manager Dick Advocaat the club appointed its first Head of Youth Development, Jan Derks, in March 2000. Derks new role was strategic and operational and saw him lay the foundations for the club's academy as well as helping the transition of the youth set-up to the new training centre. Prior to this, the club had employed a youth development officer, with their focus being solely scouting and coaching. Derks remained in position for three years despite former player Tommy McLean being recruited as his presumptive successor in May 2001 and Rangers eventually appointed former Aberdeen scout George Adams to succeed Derks in February 2003.

As the scope of the youth department grew, so did its costs, so on 20 April 2004, Rangers announced the creation of a new company which would oversee the development of the club's youth players. The company, named Rangers Youth Development Limited, was entirely self-funding but completely owned by the club. It attracted four investors from outside Rangers who have invested £1 million, with the club also putting up an initial £2.5 million. It led to Rangers F.C. being in the unfamiliar position of buying its own youth players from Rangers Youth Development Ltd. The Youth Development company owned the young players and the club had to bid for them, although it had first option on all the players. If both sides cannot reach an agreement on a transfer fee then a FIFA transfer model will be used. Any profit made by the company will be divided between investors with the majority being invested to fund more youth players. The main reason for the formation of the company was to offset the running costs of the club's training centre. However, many of the Rangers fans were opposed to the formation of the new company. The activities of Rangers Youth Development Ltd were largely unnoticed and the company was dissolved after submitting its final set of accounts in June 2010.

The elite development era
In September 2005, as part of a restructuring of the club management, Adams left his role as director of youth football. The moves also saw future Academy heads take over responsibility for youth administration. In May 2017, the club announced its intention to withdraw from the SPFL Development League and play a programme of matches against a mixture of English and European Academies, as well as sides from League One and League Two in Scotland.

In July 2018, it was reported that reserve leagues would be reintroduced in lieu of the development leagues that had been in place since 2009. The top tier of the new SPFL Reserve League featured 18 clubs, whilst a second-tier reserve League comprised nine clubs. Other than a minimum age of 16, no age restrictions applied to the leagues. At the end of its first season (2018–19) which Rangers entered and won, the club – along with several others – intimated that they would withdraw from the Reserve League to play a variety of challenge matches, in a similar manner as two years earlier. They later entered a small league (under-21 plus three overage) along with three other Scottish clubs and Brentford and Huddersfield Town from the English leagues.

In May 2021, it was reported that Rangers (and Celtic) were in 'productive' talks with the Lowland Football League (the fifth tier of the senior setup) to have colt teams playing in their division for the following season, with an earlier proposal to include them in an expanded Scottish League Two (fourth tier) still under consideration by the SPFL for the year after that.

Academy structure

The Academy is responsible for providing players for the Rangers first-team and is divided into four areas. Between under-11 and under-12 level, the teams play in a seven-a-side football competition, although the latter side transitions to 11-a-side after Christmas. Thereafter, the under-12s and under-13s play on a modified pitch which is slightly smaller with reduced sized goals than regulation play but from under-14 level onward all Academy teams play on normal pitches. All players from under-8 to under-15 are schoolboys, however, from Senior level many sign contracts to become professional youth players.
The U11 to U17 age groups play in the SFA Club Academy Scotland programme at ‘Elite’ level.

In 2017, the Rangers academy was one of eight across the country designated 'elite' status on the introduction of Project Brave, an SFA initiative to concentrate the development of the best young players at a smaller number of clubs with high quality facilities and coaching than was previously the case.

Academy partnerships
Rangers operate a North American Academy, which began in 2014, and have thirteen partner clubs across the United States and Canada.

The academy has a partnership with Coerver Coaching who deliver Coerver method skills coaching to the Children's section on a weekly basis. On 18 December 2015, Rangers announced a coaching and development partnership with Scottish Lowland League club Gala Fairydean Rovers which effectively saw the Galashiels side act as a feeder to Rangers. In June 2016, Rangers announced a partnership with East Dunbartonshire council which saw 24 of the club's youth players aged 11 to 15 attend Boclair Academy (located a short distance from the Auchenhowie complex) allowing them to combine their academic and football studies.

Competition record
Rangers were members of the Scottish Premier Reserve League from its foundation in the 1998–99 season until 2012. As the Scottish Premier League was considering disbanding its Scottish Premier Reserve League for the 2009–10 season, Rangers announced it was withdrawing its reserve team in order to play friendly games instead. After Rangers demotion to the Scottish Third Division in 2012, the club entered a reserve team into the Scottish Football League Reserve League and the side went on to win the competition. The league ended after the formation of the SPFL, with a development league for under-20's teams taking its place and the club's reserve side was disbanded.

A youth league was founded for under-18s in 1998 as an alternative to the Scottish Premier Reserve League which originally was for under-21s. The former competition was widened to include under-19s in 2003. Rangers were removed from the under-19 league after the club's demotion to the Scottish Third Division in 2012, with youth players featuring in the 2012-13 SFL Reserve league instead. The formation of the Scottish Professional Football League in the 2013–14 season, saw the formation of an under-20s league with the number of teams increased to 16 and teams were allowed to field two over-age outfield players and an overage goalkeeper. The league was renamed the SPFL Development League in 2014, with the number of teams increased to 17.

Rangers youth sides play in a number of cup competitions including the Glasgow Cup and Scottish Youth Cup. From 2015 onwards it is also possible for the Academy to participate in the UEFA Youth League by the Under-18 side winning the previous season's league at that age level, or by the senior team reaching the UEFA Champions League group stages; this was achieved in 2019 via the first route. In the 2019–20 UEFA Youth League, Rangers defeated BSC Young Boys of Switzerland in the opening round on away goals after a 5–5 result on aggregate, and eliminated Slovakians Slovan Bratislava 4–1 in the next.

In June 2016, it was announced by the SPFL that the Challenge Cup would be expanded to include teams from the Welsh Premier League, Northern Irish Premiership and an Under-20s side from each Scottish Premiership club. In the 2016–17 edition,  Rangers U20 won their opening tie against Stirling University F.C. of the Lowland League but lost in the next round to Stenhousemuir of the third level. In the 2019–20 edition, they travelled to Northern Ireland and defeated Ballymena United who had been NIFL runners-up in the previous season, then knocked out Solihull Moors of the English National League, again away from home, this time on penalties. In the quarter-finals, they beat Wrexham from the same league at Ibrox, with many of the same players also involved in a 5–0 win over Celtic in the Scottish Youth Cup a few days earlier and in the Youth League victory over Slovan ten days later. They were drawn away to Inverness CT in the semi-finals, meaning the Wrexham match would be their only home fixture in the competition, with two ties in England, one in Northern Ireland and one in the Scottish Highlands  from Glasgow. They lost 2–1 to Inverness, but also set a new record by going further than any reserve side had previously gone in the competition. A few days earlier, Rangers' run in the UEFA Youth League also came to an end with a 4–0 defeat to Atlético Madrid.

League participation

Players
In addition to below, Rangers F.C. Academy also operates youth sides from under-11 upwards.
Please note that squad numbers listed relate only to first team numbers. In youth matches the team wear 1-11 and 12-21 (21 worn in place of 13) on the bench.
Some academy players on a domestic loan can still feature for the youth sides, but cannot play for the first team.

B Team Squad
<onlyinclude>
As of 28 February 2023

Manager history
Rangers reserve side, in its various guises, has had several managers and coaches during its operation. For many years the long standing name of the second string was the Reserve team, however, due to internal restructuring it was more recently known as the Under-20 team, then the Development squad and currently B team. As consequently the title of the manager overseeing the team changed to reflect this. Below is a list of individuals who oversaw the reserve side since approximately 1983.

Staff
''As of 31 January 2023

Honours

League
 Scottish Reserve League: (22)
 1898, 1899, 1907, 1924, 1928, 1929, 1930, 1931, 1932, 1935, 1939, 1952, 1953, 1954, 1956, 1962, 1964, 1967, 1968, 1969, 1974, 1975
 Premier Reserve League: (11)
 1976, 1977, 1978, 1979, 1983, 1984, 1986, 1992, 1996, 1998
 Scottish Premier Reserve League:
 2001
 SPFL Reserve League:
2019
 Scottish Football League Reserve League:
 2013
 SFL Youth League:
 1996
 SPL U-19/SPFL Development League: (3)
 2002, 2007, 2008
 Club Academy Scotland U-18 League: 
 2019, 2021

Cup
 Scottish 2nd XI Cup: (24)
 1890, 1898, 1899, 1907, 1912, 1913, 1924, 1925, 1926, 1929, 1930, 1931, 1933, 1937, 1938, 1941, 1952, 1962, 1964, 1965, 1968, 1970, 1977, 1979
 Scottish Reserve League Cup: (12)
 1946, 1954, 1961, 1962, 1963, 1968, 1975, 1976, 1977, 1993, 1997, 1998
 Scottish Youth Cup: (8)
 1994, 1995, 2002, 2007, 2008, 2014, 2019, 2022
 Glasgow Cup: (14)
 1992, 1993, 1994, 1995, 1996, 1999, 2000, 2004, 2009, 2010, 2012, 2013, 2018, 2022
 Milk Cup: (2) (Premier)
 1984, 1992
 Milk Cup:  (Junior)
 1985
 Festival Cup: (U-20)
 2002
 Iris Club International Tournament: (2) (U-19)
 1979, 1981
 Gothia Cup: (U-18)
 1987
 Alkass International Cup: (U-17)
 2019
 Club Academy Scotland U-16 League Cup: 
2022

Academy legacy

Financial return
With the opening of the club's training facility for its youth and first teams, it was hoped that this would spell a new chapter in player development for the club. However, expectations of an instant success were not accurate and with reported running costs of the facility equalling £1.5m, many commentators asked if the investment in the training ground and youth department was worthwhile.

The combined transfer fees for all Academy graduates is, to date, approximately £30m. This includes the transfer of Nathan Patterson, the single largest fee received in the club's history for any player. Some of the other transfers that have commanded fees were in the form of compensation. The list below includes players who have been schooled at the club's Academy and have commanded a transfer upon their departure.

List of Academy graduates
Below is a list of players who made a first-team appearance for Rangers, whilst a youth team player at the club. This includes both players that have come through the club's Academy set-up and also young professional players signed for the Academy who then go on to play in the first-team. The list includes all youth team graduates from the opening of the Rangers Training Centre in 2001 to the present day.

Players in bold are currently at the club.

References

External links 
Rangers Official Website:
 Development squad
Academy
  Rangers Youths Wordpress– Rangers Under-19's Match Reports

Rangers F.C.
Scottish reserve football teams
Youth football in Scotland
Football academies in Scotland
UEFA Youth League teams
Lowland Football League teams